Kristoffer Polaha is an American actor and author. He is known for his starring roles on television as Jason Matthews in North Shore, Nathaniel "Baze" Bazile in Life Unexpected, and Henry Butler in Ringer. He has also appeared in films Devil's Knot (2013), Wonder Woman 1984 (2020) and Jurassic World Dominion (2022).

Since 2016, Polaha appeared in seven Hallmark movies and a seven-part series of Hallmark Movies & Mysteries films titled Mystery 101, saying "as an actor, I am leaning into Hallmark because it's fun to sit with my seven-year-old and show him what I do for a living. These are family-friendly movies. I'm leaning in because my 91-year-old Nana finally thinks I've made it in Hollywood because I'm on Hallmark."

Early life 
Polaha was born in Reno, Nevada to Esther and Jerome Polaha. Despite his "Hawaiian-sounding last name", Polaha is Czech. His father was a Washoe District Court Judge. Polaha is the youngest of four brothers. He left Reno in the early 1990s to attend Robert Louis Stevenson boarding school in Pebble Beach, California. In 1999, he graduated from New York University Tisch School Of  the Arts, where he earned a Bachelor's degree in Arts. He moved to Los Angeles on July 4, 2001.

Career

Film and television 
Early in his career, Polaha appeared in theatre productions, including Ragtime Revue at Lincoln Center, The Long Days Journey Into Night at the Roundabout Theater, Bread & Butter at Provincetown Playhouse, and Uncle Vanya at the Stella Adler Conservatory. In early 2000s, Polaha began appearing in small roles in several American television series and films. His first on-screen appearance was a role as Gavin in the episode "Plus One" of comedy-drama series That's Life. He had roles in television series Angel, Roswell, Birds of Prey, Tru Calling, House, CSI: Miami, It's Always Sunny in Philadelphia, Bones and Close to Home. Polaha gained attention by portraying John F. Kennedy Jr. in the TBS film America's Prince: The John F. Kennedy Jr. Story (2003) opposite Portia de Rossi. In 2021, Polaha told Highbrow Magazine: "That was the biggest TV movie that TBS had ever released. I think 40 million people watched it that night, and I had a picture in Times Square of my face."

In 2004, he won the lead role of Jason Matthews on the prime-time soap opera North Shore. The series centered on the staff and guests of the fictional Grand Waimea Hotel and Resort. North Shore concluded in January 2005 after a 21-episode, single-season run. Polaha and his family lived in Hawaii for a year and their son was born there. In 2007, Polaha took the role of Carlton Hanson on drama television series Mad Men. In 2008, Polaha starred on the series Miss Guided and appeared in the biographical film Billy: The Early Years (2008). In 2009, he appeared in several guest starring television roles, including The Ex List, Dollhouse, Without a Trace and Better Off Ted. In 2010, he began portraying Nate Bazile, a bar owner who discovers he has a teenage daughter Lux Cassidy (Britt Robertson), on the teen drama series Life Unexpected. The series garnered mostly positive feedback during its two seasons, with many reviews favorably comparing the show to the critically acclaimed series Gilmore Girls and Everwood. In November 2010, Polaha signed a talent holding deal with CBS. Polaha founded a production company titled Podunk Productions in 2010. He played writer Henry Butler in The CW's thriller crime series Ringer until the series conclusion in 2012. Las Vegas Weekly gave Ringer a mixed review, saying it was "a little silly but also juicy and well-acted". In 2012, he landed a guest role on the second season of MTV's teen comedy series Awkward.
Polaha starred as John Galt in Atlas Shrugged: Part III, which was released on September 12, 2014. He appeared in the movies Devil's Knot (2013), Back in the Day (2014), Where Hope Grows (2015) and Vineland (2016). Where Hope Grows centers on the friendship between Calvin (portrayed by Polaha), a former professional baseball player and Produce (David DeSanctis), a young man with Down syndrome. The film grossed $1.2 million at the box office. He had a lead role as Jodie King in the short film Frontman (2016). He earned a Jury Award for Best Actor at Seattle Shorts Film Festival for his performance in Frontman. In 2017, Polaha played Jeffrey in five episodes of the comedy-drama television series Get Shorty.

Polaha has starred in several original Hallmark Channel films, including Dater's Handbook (2016) opposite Meghan Markle, Rocky Mountain Christmas (2017) opposite Lindy Booth and Pearl in Paradise (2018) alongside Jill Wagner. Especially Rocky Mountain Christmas was a success for the network. Polaha commented the film's popularity by saying: "Rocky Mountain Christmas won the night on cable. We had the highest ratings, not just the highest ratings ever in the history of Hallmark Movies & Mysteries, but we won the night across all the cable channels. It was a big deal for Hallmark, and it was a big deal for us as a cast because it really did set our movie apart. It was definitely one of those special moments." In 2018, he appeared in six episodes of the thriller television series Condor and starred in two films, Beneath the Leaves and Bachelor Lions.

He played detective Travis Burke in Hallmark's mystery television film series Mystery 101 (2019) opposite Jill Wagner. The film series included four movies and the first one aired on January 27, 2019. Polaha portrayed Michael Truett in the Christian drama film Run the Race (2019), released on February 22, 2019 by Roadside Attractions. The film made $2.3 million in its opening weekend, finishing 10th at the box office. In November 2018, Polaha revealed that he will appear in the upcoming film Wonder Woman 1984 (2020). Polaha had a minor but notable role as Handsome Man in the superhero film Wonder Woman 1984 (2020) directed by Patty Jenkins. On July 26, 2019, The Hollywood Reporter announced that Polaha will appear in Hallmark Channel's Christmas-themed television film Double Holiday (2019) opposite Carly Pope. In 2020, he had a small role as Courthouse Reporter 2 in Hulu's drama miniseries Little Fires Everywhere starring Reese Witherspoon and Kerry Washington. Polaha starred in Hallmark's original Christmas film A Dickens of a Holiday! (2021) as Jake Dorsey, famous action star who grew up in Dickens, Ohio. Decider gave the film a favorable review by commenting: "This movie is really about Craig’s relationship with Jake—and it’s incredibly rare to see a Hallmark movie put all the heavy emotions on a brother/brother relationship. It’s very well done and a smart change of pace." 

Polaha appeared as CIA officer Wyatt Huntley in the science fiction film Jurassic World Dominion (2022), which was a financial success, grossing $1 billion worldwide and becoming the second highest-grossing film of 2022.

Books 
In June 2020, Variety reported that Polaha had signed a book deal with Rosewind Books to co-author a series of romance novels with Anna Gomez. The first in the From Kona with Love book series, titled Moments Like This, is set in Hawaii and centers on a young woman looking to find herself after losing her career and relationship. It was published on February 2, 2021. The second book, Where the Sun Rises, is scheduled to be released on March 29, 2022 by Vesuvian Media’s Rosewind Books.

Polaha plans to produce the books for film and television through his production company Podunk Productions.

Personal life

Polaha is a practicing Christian and spoke about how he fell away from his faith, but a death-defying experience made him believe again. In 2019, when asked in an interview what he would like to be remembered for, Polaha replied: "So I'm an actor, and if an audience is going to remember me, I'd kind of like to be in the same boat as Jimmy Stewart, Tom Hanks...these guys who are really great at their craft but who've also made people feel really good on a human level. Even Audrey Hepburn was somebody who – wouldn't it be great to have these amazing successes as an actor so that aspect of your life was a given, but then the stories also include how kind they are. Just what good people they were. And I would love that to be my legacy."

Polaha married actress Julianne Morris on June 7, 2003 at the Windermere Chapel in Windermere, Florida. The couple has three sons born in 2004, 2006, and 2011.

Filmography

Film

Television

Awards and nominations

Bibliography 

 Polaha, Kristoffer & Gomez, Anna (2021). Moments Like This. Rosewind Books.
 Polaha, Kristoffer & Gomez, Anna (2022). Where the Sun Rises. Rosewind Books.

References

External links
 

1977 births
Living people
American male film actors
American male television actors
American Christians
Male actors from Nevada
Actors from Reno, Nevada
21st-century American male actors